Daniel Odafin (born 5 January 1989) is a Nigerian professional footballer, who last played for Lefke Türk.

Club career

Bahrain
In 2007, he began his professional footballing career in the Middle East and more accurately Bahrain where he signed a one-year contract with Bahraini Premier League club, Al-Hala SC. He scored 1 goal in 15 appearances for the Halat Bu Maher-based club in the 2007–08 Bahraini Premier League.

Syria
In 2008, he moved to Western Asia and more accurately to Syria where he signed a one-year contract with Tishreen SC. He made 18 appearances for the Latakia-based club in the 2008–09 Syrian Premier League.

In 2009, he moved to Al-Hasakah where he signed a one-year contract with another Syrian Premier League club, Al-Jazeera SC Hasakah. He scored 1 goal in 20 appearances in the 2009–10 Syrian Premier League.

He moved back to Latakia in 2010 and signed a one-year contract with Hutteen SC. He made 12 appearances in the 2010–11 Syrian Premier League.

Lebanon

In 2011, he moved to Lebanon, where he signed a long-term contract with Shabab Al-Sahel. He made his Lebanese Premier League debut on 23 October 2011 in a 2–0 win over Salam Sour and scored his first and only goal of the season on 4 May 2012 in a 3–2 win over Al-Ansar SC. He scored 1 goal in 19 appearances in the 2011–12 Lebanese Premier League. He made his first appearance in the 2012–13 Lebanese Premier League on 30 September 2012 in a 1–0 win over Racing Beirut and scored his first and only goal of the season on 18 November 2012 in a 2–1 loss against Al-Ahed. He scored 1 goal in 21 appearances in the 2012–13 season. He also made an appearance in the 2012–13 Lebanese FA Cup and scored 1 goal helping his club achieve the runners-up position. He made another appearance in the 2013 Lebanese Super Cup where his club lost 1–0 against Al-Safa' SC. He made his first appearance in the 2013–14 Lebanese Premier League on 21 September 2013 in a 2–1 loss against Al-Ahed. He made 20 appearances in the 2013–14 Lebanese Premier League. He was also voted as the 2013–14 season's best midfielder in the country.

Iraq

In 2014, he moved to Iraq, where he signed a short-term contract with Iraqi Premier League club, Al-Zawra'a SC. He made 6 appearances for the Karkh-based club in the 2014–15 Iraqi Premier League.

Oman

On 26 January 2015, he signed a six-month contract with 2013–14 Oman Professional League winners, Al-Nahda Club. He made his Oman Professional League debut on 4 February 2014 in a 3–1 loss against Al-Shabab, a match in which he was sent off at the 70th minute of the game. He also made an appearance in the 2015 AFC Champions League qualifying play-off match on 10 February 2015 in a 2–1 loss against Qatari side, El Jaish SC. He also made an appearance in a 2–1 loss against 2013–14 Qatar Stars League runners-up, El Jaish SC in the Preliminary Round 2 of 2015 AFC Champions League qualifying play-off and hence failed to advance to the 2015 AFC Champions League group stage. He made his AFC Cup debut on 24 February 2015 in a 2–1 win over 2013–14 Syrian Premier League winners, Al-Wahda SC Damascus. He finished with 6 appearances in the 2015 AFC Cup.

Back to Lebanon
In September 2014, he moved back to Lebanon, and more accurately to Beirut, where he signed a one-year contract with his former club, Shabab Al-Sahel. He made his first appearance in the 2015–16 Lebanese Premier League on 18 October 2015 in a 1–1 draw against Nejmeh SC and scored his only goal of the season on 7 November 2015 in a 2–1 win over Salam Zgharta. He finished with 1 goal in 18 appearances in the 2015-16 season.

Later in 2016, he moved to Al-Nabi Sheet where he signed a one-year contract with another Lebanese Premier League side, Al-Nabi Shayth. He made his debut for the club on 11 September 2016 in a 2–1 loss against Tadamon Sour.

India
In September 2017, the Nigerian moved to India where he signed a one-year contract with I-League side, Shillong Lajong F.C.

Club career statistics

Honours

Club
With Shabab Al-Sahel
Lebanese FA Cup (0): Runner-up 2012-13
Lebanese Super Cup (0): Runner-up 2013

Individual
Lebanese Premier League Best Defensive Midfielder: 2013-14

References

External links
 Daniel Odafin at KTFF
 Daniel Odafin at Goal.com
 

1989 births
Living people
People from Lagos
Nigerian footballers
Nigerian expatriate footballers
Association football midfielders
Tishreen SC players
Al-Nahda Club (Oman) players
Al Hala SC players
Shabab Al Sahel FC players
Al Nabi Chit SC players
Shillong Lajong FC players
Oman Professional League players
Lebanese Premier League players
I-League players
Expatriate footballers in Bahrain
Nigerian expatriate sportspeople in Bahrain
Expatriate footballers in Syria
Nigerian expatriate sportspeople in Syria
Expatriate footballers in Lebanon
Nigerian expatriate sportspeople in Lebanon
Expatriate footballers in Iraq
Nigerian expatriate sportspeople in Iraq
Expatriate footballers in Oman
Nigerian expatriate sportspeople in Oman
Expatriate footballers in India
Nigerian expatriate sportspeople in India
Expatriate footballers in Cyprus
Nigerian expatriate sportspeople in Cyprus
Syrian Premier League players
Residents of Lagos